Erwin Klumpp (1921 – 2010) was a Swiss water polo player. He competed in the men's tournament at the 1948 Summer Olympics.

References

External links
 

1921 births
2010 deaths
Swiss male water polo players
Olympic water polo players of Switzerland
Water polo players at the 1948 Summer Olympics
Place of birth missing